1993 London bombing may refer to:

1993 Bishopsgate bombing in the City of London
1993 Harrods bombing
1993 Camden Town bombing
October 1993 bombs in London